Stilbia is a genus of moths of the family Noctuidae.

Species
 Stilbia algirica Culot, 1914
 Stilbia andalusiaca Staudinger, 1892
 Stilbia anomala (Haworth, 1812)
 Stilbia bongiovanni Turati, 1924
 Stilbia calberlae (Failla-Tedaldi, 1890)
  Püngeler, 1918
 Stilbia nisseni Stertz, 1914
 Stilbia philopalis Graslin, 1852
 Stilbia powelli Boursin, 1940
 Stilbia syriaca Staudinger, 1892
 Stilbia turatii Lucas, 1910

References
Natural History Museum Lepidoptera genus database
Stilbia at funet

Hadeninae